Zdravko Velimirović (11 October 1930 – 7 February 2005) was a Yugoslavian film director and screenwriter, University Professor, a member of the Academy of Arts and Sciences. He directed 43 films between 1954 and 2005.

Early life 
Zdravko Velimirović was born on 11 October 1930 in Cetinje, the son of Professor Luka Velimirović and Professor Zagorka (née Balić) Velimirović. He completed High school in Kotor.

Career 
During his career he was involved in  variety of Arts: film director of feature, documentary and short films, TV series director, radio drama director, theatre play director and screenwriter for all mentioned. Apart from his great achievement in arts and culture in Yugoslavia, he had outstanding cooperation with well-known film makers in the West and East and worldwide film societies. For many years in his career, He was also university professor and the principal at the Belgrade Dramatic Arts University, where many of his former students formed as world-class film makers. He was on sabbatical, teaching as a professor in Canada and lectured by invitation in various academies and art institutes around the world. He married Ranka Velimirovic, film and TV producer, in 1963, and they happily lived and worked together throughout life.

Filmography

Documentaries 

 Zublja Grahovačka (1958)
 Nokturno za Kotor, (1959)
 U spomen slavne mornarice (1959)
 Četvrta strana (1963)
 Rade, sin Tomov; Njegošu uz hodočašće (1964)
 Lux Aeterna; Večita svetlost (1965)
 Ekselencija (1966)
 Španija naše mladosti (1967)
 A, to ste vi! (1968)
 Skenderbeg (1968)
 Tajna večera; Medijala (1969)
 Prvi pešački prolazi (1969)
 Srušeni grad (1970)
 Ostrog (1970)
 More, sunce i... (1971)
 U zdravom telu, zdrav je i duh (1971)
 Umir krvi (1971)
 Dokaz (1972)
 Pogibija (1972)
 Podanici drevnog kulta (1977)
 Derviši (1977)
 Most (1979)
 Veselnik (1980)
 Gradsko saobraćajno Beograd (1981)
 Kad ti kao ličnost nestaješ (1983)
 Srpska akademija nauka i umetnosti (1984)
 Kako sačuvati grad (1987)
 Uzvišenje (1991)
 Rijeka Zeta, majka i kolijevka (1991)
 Povratak na Medun (1992)
 Piva (1993)
 Njegoš u Boki (1995)
 Naši dragi gosti (1996)
 Kapa lovćenska (1996)
 Gifts to the home of sacred warriors (Gifts to the home of holy warriors) (Original title: Darovi domu svetih ratnika) (2004)

Awards 
 The "13th july" award for the film "Zublja grahovačka", Yugoslavia 1958.
 The "13th july" award for the film "Lelejska gora", Yugoslavia 1967.
 Golden Arena for Best Director 1974
 Golden Arena for Best Screenplay 1976
 Silver Knight award for film "Gifts to the home of holy warriors" at Golden knights film festival in Tambov, Russia 2004.
 Award for best religious-cultural film for film "Gifts to the home of holy warriors" at Religious, cultural and tourist film festival in Lecce, Italy 2007.	
 Award for film "Gifts to the home of sacred warriors" in the category of religious documentaries at ART&TUR International Film Festival in Barcelos, Portugal 2008.

References

Sources
1,•  "Srpski Legat: Rođen je reditelj, scenarista i profesor Zdravko Velimirović". srpskilegat.rs. 11 October 2016. Retrieved 16 June 2020.
2.•  ^ Jump up to: a b "Intervju: Ranka Velimirović, supruga i saradnica Zdravka Velimirovića". dan.co.me. 21 February 2015. Retrieved 29 September 2015.
3.  ^ Jump up to: a b c d e "Portret Zdravka Velimirovića". Seecult.org. 13 December 2010. Retrieved 29 September 2015.
4.•  ^ Jump up to: a b "Omaž reditelju Zdravku Velimirović u Kotoru". Radio Kotor www.radiokotor.info. 22 March 2018. Retrieved 12 August 2018.
5.•  ^ Jump up to: a b "Pekić i Velimirović: Išli su sami svojim putem". Večernje novosti online www.novosti.rs. 14 April 2014. Retrieved 29 September 2015.
6.http://www.seecult.org/vest/u-cast-zdravka-velimirovica-u-kinoteci

External links 

  Belgrade Documentary and Short Film Festival: Zdravko Velimirovic the Last Professor

1930 births
2005 deaths
People from Cetinje
Film people from Belgrade
Serbian film directors
Montenegrin film directors
Yugoslav film directors
Serbian screenwriters
Male screenwriters
Golden Arena for Best Director winners
University of Paris alumni
University of Belgrade alumni
Academic staff of the University of Belgrade
Members of the Montenegrin Academy of Sciences and Arts
Yugoslav artists
20th-century screenwriters